The 2016 NCAA Division I men's soccer season was the 58th season of NCAA championship men's college soccer.  The regular season began on August 26 and continued into the first weekend of November 2016. The season culminated with the 2016 NCAA Division I Men's Soccer Championship in December 2016. There were 206 teams in men's Division I competition. The defending champions were Stanford who defeated Clemson 4–0  to win its first NCAA soccer title. The season concluded with Stanford defending its title by defeating Wake Forest 5–4 in a penalty kick shootout following a 0–0 double-overtime draw.

Changes from 2015

Coaching changes

New programs 
Chicago State was initially budgeted to finally start competition in the Western Athletic Conference this season. However, the ongoing State of Illinois budgetary crisis and the school's own critical financial problems have set this back once more.

Mount St. Mary's University announced that their soccer program, which has been dormant since the end of the 2012 season, will be reinstated for the 2018 season.

Discontinued programs 
None.

Conference realignment

Video review
The NCAA Playing Rules Oversight Panel approved voluntary video review for the 2016 season. Video may be used to determine whether a goal has been scored, to identify players for disciplinary matters, and to determine whether a fight occurred and identify the participants.

Use of video review in both men's and women's soccer is strictly voluntary, with coaches for both teams agreeing to its use before the game. The home team is responsible for the equipment and for making review possible either at the scorer's table or at another ground-level location. As in other NCAA sports, the video review must display indisputable evidence for a call to be overturned.

Proposed Division I season change
After many months of extended unofficial discussion, on August 22, 2016, NCAA Division I men's coaches and the National Soccer Coaches Association of America (NSCAA) officially began an "informational campaign" to build support for a proposed change of the playing schedule for Division I men's soccer. Under the proposed changes of the "Academic Year Season Model", the number of games on the Fall schedule and the number of mid-week games would be reduced, with games added in the Spring following a Winter break, and the NCAA Division I Men's Soccer Championship tournament would be moved from November and December to May and June. In addition to more closely matching the professional season, the changes address issues of player health and safety and of the time demands on student-athletes. The proposal concerns only Division I men's soccer. While a large majority of men's coaches and players support the changes, only a small minority of women's coaches and players currently do so. At this time, there is only the "informational campaign" "...to educate our Athletic Directors, NCAA leadership, student athletes, coaches and fans on the advantages of this Academic Year Model,” said Sasho Cirovski, NSCAA D1 Men's committee chair and University of Maryland head coach. No formal proposal has been made to the NCAA, and once proposed, could not come into effect any earlier than the 2017–18 academic year.

Season overview

Pre-season polls

Regular season

#1

Conference standings

Major upsets 
In this list, a "major upset" is defined as a game won by a team ranked 10 or more spots lower or an unranked team that defeats a team ranked #15 or higher.

Early season tournaments 
Several universities hosted early season soccer tournaments.

Conference winners and tournaments

Statistics

Individuals

Last update on 13 December 2016Last update on 13 December 2016

Last update on 13 December 2016Last update on 13 December 2016

Last update on 13 December 2016Last update on 13 December 2016
 NOTE: Niki Jackson of Grand Canyon was among thenational leaders in both Goals (16) and Total Points (34),but his school was in its final year of transition fromDivision II to Division I, making the school and its athletesineligible for consideration for statistical placement.
 Individual statistics are through the games of 11 December 2016.

Teams
Last update on 13 December 2016Last update on 13 December 2016

Last update on 13 December 2016
 Team statistics are through the games of 11 December 2016. NOTE: UMass Lowell finished its season 13–1–2 (.875) but was in its final year of transition from Division II to Division I, making the school ineligible for consideration for both statistical placement and postseason play.
Last update on 13 December 2016

See also 
 College soccer
 List of NCAA Division I men's soccer programs
 2016 in American soccer
 2016 NCAA Division I Men's Soccer Championship
 2016 NCAA Division I women's soccer season

References 

 
NCAA